Thathaiyangarpet is a panchayat town in Tiruchirappalli district in the Indian state of Tamil Nadu.

Demographics
 India census, Thathaiyangarpet had a population of 12,276. Males constitute 51% of the population and females 49%. Thathaiyangarpet has an average literacy rate of 70%, higher than the national average of 59.5%: male literacy is 78%, and female literacy is 62%. In Thathaiyangarpet, 9% of the population is under 6 years of age.

References

Cities and towns in Tiruchirappalli district